Historical geography is the branch of geography that studies the ways in which geographic phenomena have changed over time. It is a synthesizing discipline which shares both topical and methodological similarities with history, anthropology, ecology, geology, environmental studies, literary studies, and other fields. Although the majority of work in historical geography is considered human geography, the field also encompasses studies of geographic change which are not primarily anthropogenic. Historical geography is often a major component of school and university curricula in geography and social studies. Current research in historical geography is being performed by scholars in more than forty countries.

Themes
Historical geography seeks to determine how cultural features of various societies across the planet emerged and evolved by understanding their interaction with their local environment and surroundings.

Development of the discipline
In its early days, historical geography was difficult to define as a subject. A textbook  from the 1950s cites a previous definition as an 'unsound attempt by geographers to explain history'. Its author, J. B. Mitchell, came down firmly on the side of geography: 'the historical geographer is a geographer first last and all the time'. By 1975 the first number of the Journal of Historical Geography  had widened the discipline to a broader church: 'the writings of scholars of any disciplinary provenance who have something to say about matters of geographical interest relating to past time'.

In the United States of America, the term historical geography is the name given by Carl Ortwin Sauer of the University of California, Berkeley to his program of reorganizing cultural geography (some say all geography) along regional lines, beginning in the first decades of the 20th century. To Sauer, a landscape and the cultures in it could only be understood if all of its influences through history were taken into account: physical, cultural, economic, political, environmental. Sauer stressed regional specialization as the only means of gaining sufficient expertise on regions of the world. Sauer's philosophy was the principal shaper of American geographic thought in the mid-20th century. Regional specialists remain in academic geography departments to this day. Despite this, some geographers feel that it harmed the discipline; that too much effort was spent on data collection and classification, and too little on analysis and explanation. Studies became more and more area-specific as later geographers struggled to find places to make names for themselves. These factors may have led in turn to the 1950s crisis in geography, which raised serious questions about geography as an academic discipline in the USA.

This sub-branch of human geography is closely related to history, environmental history, and historical ecology.

List of historical geographers

Major institutions
 The Historical Geography Specialty Group of the American Association of Geographers 
 The Historical Geography Research Group of the Royal Geographical Society

Major journals
 Journal of Historical Geography
 Historical Geography

See also
 Historical atlas

References

Further reading
 Catchpole, Brian. A Map History of the Modern World: 1890 to the Present Day. 1972 ed. Agincourt, Ont.: Bellhaven House, 1972. N.B.: First ed. published in 1968; an earlier revision with corrections appeared in 1970; partly an atlas of historical geography, partly an atlas illustrating historical events and trends.  
 Baker, A.R.H. Geography and History: Bridging the Divide (Cambridge University Press, 2003)

 
Human geography